Amathikama is a 1968 Sri Lankan Black and white drama film directed by Nihal Jayasinghe and produced by S. P. Muththaiya. The film stars Joe Abeywickrama and Sandhya Kumari in lead roles whereas Hugo Fernando, D.R. Nanayakkara and Pearl Vasudevi made supportive roles. Music directed by R. Muttusamy.

Cast
 Joe Abeywickrama as Mudalali
 Hugo Fernando as Arachchi
 Sandhya Kumari
 D.R. Nanayakkara
 Pearl Vasudevi
 Jessica Wickramasinghe
 H. R. Jothipala
 B. S. Perera
 Sirimathi Rasadari
 Eddie Junior
 Lilian Edirisinghe
 M. V. Balan
 Hilda Agnes
 Milton Jayawardena
 Pujitha Mendis
 Sunil Wesley Perera
 Ione Weerasinghe

References

External links
 

1968 films
1960s Sinhala-language films